Perfect Time is a music album by Irish musician Máire Brennan (now known as Moya Brennan). This recording was for the Word Records company. It was released in 1998.

Recordings were made in Ireland during 1998:

Mo Studio, Dublin, Ireland – (Engineer Chris O'Brien)
The Production Suite, Dublin, Ireland – (Engineer Chris O'Brien)

Track listing
"The Big Rock" – 3:04
"Perfect Time" – 4:46
"The Light on the Hill" – 4:02
"Na Páistí (The Children)" – 2:39
"Heal This Land" – 3:45
"Song of David" (Psalm 67) – 4:08
"Our World" – 6:10
"Doon Well" – 3:57
"Grá Dé (The Love of God)" – 6:25
"The Big Rock" (Instrumental Version) – 3:03

Personnel

Band
Máire Brennan – Vocals, Harp, Keyboards
Dee Brennan – Bodhran, Vocals (on Na Páistí)
Graham Murphy – Keyboards
Denis Woods – Keyboards
Gerry O'Conner – Fiddle
Anthony Drennan – Guitars
David Downes – Uilleann pipes, Low Whistles
Cór Mhuire na Doirí Bige the choir of St. Mary's Church, Derrybeg, Donegal – Choir (on Song of David)
Baba Brennan – Choir Leader

Singles

Commercial singles
"Heal This Land"
"The Big Rock"

Promotional singles
"Perfect Time"
"The Light on the Hill"

Release details
1998, UK, Word Records MCD 60052, Release Date ? April 1998, CD
1998, UK, Word Records MCC 50052, Release Date ? April 1998, Cassette
1998, UK, Word Records 7019965601, Release Date ? April 1998, CD
1998, USA, Word Records MCD 69143, Release Date ? April 1998, CD
1998, USA, Word Records 7019965504, Release Date ? April 1998, Cassette
1998, Japan, Columbia Records ESCA 7426, Release Date ? April 1998, Cassette

External links
 This album at Northern Skyline

Moya Brennan albums
1998 albums